Ketch Ranch House or Ketch Ranch was private property located in the Wichita Mountains of Southwestern Oklahoma. The ranch was established as a working ranch and vacation home for Ada May Ketch and Frank Levant Ketch during the early 1920s.

Ada May Ketch purchased the Wichita Mountain acreage on May 8, 1923, from S.P. Thornhill through the property holdings of First National Bank of Lawton. The Ketch Ranch was developed during the economic prosperity years of the Roaring Twenties which simultaneously encompassed the creation of Oklahoma Senator Elmer Thomas's River Rock Resort better known as Medicine Park, Oklahoma.

By 1932, the Ketch Ranch estate began to acknowledge the financial crisis coerced by the Wall Street Crash of 1929. In 1934, the estate was sold on a joint extension agreement to the Monte Vista Ranch enterprise whereas the Ketch family retained the Wichita Mountain ranch. On January 10, 1941, the United States government acquired the Monte Vista Ranch property through the provisions of Declaration of Taking Act authorizing a land expansion of the Fort Sill Military Reservation while protecting the United States national security at the commencement of World War II.

Case Law and Jake L. Hamon, Sr. Estate

Frank Ketch served as the business enterprise administrator for the Jake L. Hamon Sr. estate. Mr. Hamon governed a diverse portfolio of holdings and ownership in oil and gas lease properties in the crude oil fields of Healdton, Oklahoma and Hewitt, Oklahoma geographically apportioned as South Central Oklahoma.

By 1920, Jake L. Hamon Properties invested in the Breckenridge oilfields of Stephens County geographically apportioned in North Texas decisively exemplary of the 1920s Texas oil boom and interwar period.

During 1921, the Jake L. Hamon investments were appraised at three million U.S. dollars considering a brief eight year period of time after discovering a prosperous 1914 blowout in the Healdton oilfield.

Court Cases of Jake L. Hamon, Sr. Estate

Pictorial Biography

Native American Culture of Wichita Mountains
Craterville Park was established after the Kiowa-Comanche-Apache land openings coinciding with Oklahoma statehood as confirmed on November 16, 1907.

In 1907, cowboy naturalist Frank Rush was serving as the superintendent of the Wichita Forest and Game Reserve. Mr. Rush attained local and statewide recognition for the railway transport facilitation and safeguard of the near extinct American bison during October of 1907. 
The Plains bison herd was granted to the state by the Bronx Zoological Gardens and New York Zoological Society for the permanent habitat and species reintroduction to the native lands of the southwest Indian Territory within the Wichita National Forest.

In 1924, the Apache, Comanche, and Kiowa vowed to a pledged of the Craterville Park Covenant with Wichita National Forest Preserve curator Frank Rush. The Wichita Mountains mixed grass prairie served for the local tribal pow wow events during the Craterville Park Indian Fair from 1924 to 1933.

At the transition of the twentieth century, the Quanah Parker Star House was located south of the Quanah Mountain summit or Wichita Mountains Wildlife Refuge.

The Native American immeasurable presence cultivated a historical perspective of the tribal culture and tribal sovereignty for the last of the 19th century American Indian tribal chiefs. During the final decade of the nineteenth century, the Southwest Oklahoma native tribes began embracing the ceremonial practices of the Native American Church while residing in the Great Plains of Southwestern Oklahoma and the Wichita Mountains.

See also

Historical Perspective for Exploration of Oil
The Prize: The Epic Quest for Oil, Money, and Power

Historical Video Archive
☆ 
☆

References

Further reading

Periodical Bibliography

Petroleum Industry Bibliography

External links
 
 
 
 
 
 
 

Buildings and structures in Comanche County, Oklahoma
Houses in Comanche County, Oklahoma
Eminent domain